Don Diego de San Francisco Tehuetzquititzin (sometimes called Tehuetzquiti or Tehuetzqui) (died 1554) was the 16th tlatoani and second governor of Tenochtitlan.

Biography
According to Chimalpahin, Tehuetzquititzin's father Tezcatl Popocatzin was a son of Tizoc, the seventh ruler of Tenochtitlan. 

Tehuetzquititzin became both tlatoani and governor of Tenochtitlan in 1541, after the death of the previous governor, don Diego de Alvarado Huanitzin. In the same year, he participated in the Mixtón War in Nueva Galicia (Nahuatl: Xochipillan), led by viceroy Antonio de Mendoza.

On 23 December 1546, a cédula was issued by Charles V and his mother Joanna granting don Diego a personal coat of arms in recognition of his service, particularly in the war in Nueva Galicia, and so that "other [Indian] nobles will be inspired to serve us". His arms included the indigenous symbol of Tenochtitlan — a prickly pear cactus growing out of a stone in the middle of a lake — which would centuries later feature in the coat of arms of Mexico, as well as an eagle that may represent Huitzilopochtli.

Tehuetzquititzin died in 1554, having ruled for 14 years. Rather than being immediately replaced by a successor, don Esteban de Guzmán came to Tenochtitlan as juez de residencia. He remained as juez until 1557, when don Cristóbal de Guzmán Cecetzin was installed as ruler.

Personal life
He took as his Christian wife his first cousin, doña María, with whom he had two children, don Alonso Tezcatl Popocatzin and don Pablo (or Pedro) Mauhcaxochitzin, both of whom died young.

By other women he had also had children named don Miguel (or Pablo) Ixcuinantzin (who also died young), don Pedro Xiconocatzin, don José Xaxaqualiuhtocatzin, don Baltasar Ilhuicaxochitzin (who also died young), doña Juana, doña María Tlacoyehuatzin, doña María Francisca, another doña María, and doña Cecilia.

See also
List of Tenochtitlan rulers

Notes

References
 
 
 

|-

|-

Year of birth missing
1554 deaths
Tenochca tlatoque
Governors of San Juan Tenochtitlan